The 2016 Kazan Kremlin Cup was a professional tennis tournament played on hard courts. It was the seventh edition of the tournament which was part of the 2016 ATP Challenger Tour. It took place in Kazan, Russia between 14 and 20 March 2016.

Singles main-draw entrants

Seeds

 1 Rankings are as of March 7, 2016

Other entrants
The following players received wildcards into the singles main draw:
   Alexander Boborykin
  Alexander Bublik
  Daniil Medvedev

The following player entered into the singles main draw with a protected ranking:
  Albano Olivetti

The following players received entry from the qualifying draw:
  Ilya Ivashka
  Markos Kalovelonis 
  Alexandre Sidorenko 
  Dzmitry Zhyrmont

The following players entered the singles main draw as lucky losers:
  Maxim Dubarenco
  Denis Matsukevich
  Alexey Vatutin

Champions

Singles

  Tobias Kamke def.  Aslan Karatsev, 6–4, 6–2

Doubles

  Aliaksandr Bury /  Igor Zelenay def.  Konstantin Kravchuk /  Philipp Oswald, 6–2, 4–6, [10–6]

References
 Singles Main Draw

Kazan Kremlin Cup
Kazan Kremlin Cup
21st century in Kazan
2016 in Russian tennis
March 2016 sports events in Russia